The Early Pagan Kingdom was a city-state that existed in the first millennium CE before the emergence of the Pagan Empire in the mid 11th century. The Burmese chronicles state that the "kingdom" was founded in the second century CE. The seat of power of the small kingdom was first located at Arimaddana, Thiri Pyissaya, and Tampawaddy until 849 CE when it was moved to Pagan (Bagan).

Radiocarbon dating shows the earliest human settlement in the Pagan region dates only from the mid-7th century CE. It existed alongside Pyu city-states that dominated Upper Burma. The city-state of Pagan, according to mainstream scholarship, was founded in the mid 9th century by the Mranma of Nanzhao Kingdom. Burmans at Pagan expanded irrigation-based cultivation while borrowing extensively from the Pyus' predominantly Buddhist culture. It was one of many competing city-states in the Pyu realm until the late 10th century when the principality began absorbing its surrounding states. The expansion accelerated in the 1050s and 1060s when King Anawrahta founded the Pagan Empire, the first ever unification of the Irrawaddy valley and its periphery.

Chronicle tradition

Formation
Various Burmese chronicles do not agree on the date of foundation of Pagan. One of the earliest chronicles, Yazawin Kyaw compiled in 1520, states that the kingdom of Pagan was founded in 156 CE by King Pyusawhti. The 18th century chronicle Maha Yazawin links the Pagan monarchs to the Sri Ksetra Kingdom, stating that Pagan was founded in 107 CE by King Thamoddarit, a scion of Sri Ksetra Kingdom. The Buddha visited the future site of Pagan during his lifetime and predicted that a great city would arise at the very site 651 years after his death (107 CE). The 19th century chronicle Hmannan Yazawin went further, asserting that the founders of the Pagan dynasty ultimate trace their origins back to the clan of the Buddha.

Still according to the standard chronicles, Thamoddarit fixed the capital at Arimaddana-pura, ("the City that Tramples on Enemies"), near present-day Nyaung U, and named his kingdom Pugarama. His "kingdom" included 19 villages in the region. The 19 villages were: (1) Nyaung U, (2) Naga Soe, (3) Naga Kyit, (4) Magyi Kyi, (5) Htude, (6) Kyauk Zaga, (7) Ohte Thein, (8) Nyaungwun, (9) Anuradha, (10) Dazaungkun, (11) Ywa Mohn, (12) Kyinlo, (13) Kokko, (14) Taungpa, (15) Myegedwin, (16) Thayet Ya, (17) Singu, (18) Yonlut, and (19) Ywa Zaik.

According to Burmese Buddhist tradition, Pagan was known by different classical names even in the ages of previous Buddhas (i.e. before the present era of Gautama Buddha). The names below are Burmese versions of Pali names.

Thamoddarit then appointed Pyusawhti, the founder of Pagan according to Yazawin Kyaw, as heir apparent for the commoner's bravery in defeating enemies of the state. Pyusawhti came to power in 167 CE. He ruled for 45 years, implementing foundation institutions of the state, including its first law treatise (dhammathat).

The chronicles continue that King Thili Kyaung I (r. 344–387) moved the palace to Thiri Pyissaya, not far from the Pugama site. In 439, King Thihtan died without leaving an heir, and the throne was contested among three senior ministers at the court. The victor of the power struggle, the minister Thuye ruled until his death in 494. The Pyusawhti line was restored when King Tharamon Phya, a grandson of Thihtan, was put in power by the court. Tharamon Phya's successor Thaik Taing (r. 516–523) moved the palace to Tampawaddy, near Thiri Pyissaya.

The following is the list of Pagan kings as given in the main chronicles.

Middle Early Pagan
The next important king was Popa Sawrahan (r. 613–640). The former monk seized the throne after King Htun Chit died in 613 CE. He launched the Burmese calendar on 21 March 640 CE, with the starting date of 22 March 638. (According to scholarship, the Burmese calendar was actually launched at Sri Ksetra (Pyay/Prome) by the Pyu.) Popa Sawrahan made peace with the royal line by giving his daughter to Shwe Ohnthi, son of Htun Chit and rightful heir, and making his son-in-law the heir apparent. Popa Sawrahan died in 640 soon after his new calendar was launched, and Shwe Ohnthi succeeded, restoring the Pyusawhti line. Shwe Ohnthi was followed by another a dozen kings to year 846 CE. In 846 CE, King Pyinbya (r. 846–886) came to power. Three years into his reign, on 23 December 849, he moved the capital to the present-day site of Pagan.

All four main chronicles are in agreement with the regnal dates in this period.

Late Early Pagan
After Pyinbya's successor and son Tannet died in 904 CE, the throne passed on to a series of usurpers for nearly a century to 1001 CE. Nyaung-u Sawrahan (r. 956–1001), the earliest inscriptionally verified king, ruled for 45 years. A descendant of Pyusawhti, Kunhsaw Kyaunghpyu restored the old royal line in 1001 but 20 years later, he was pushed out by the sons of Nyaung-u Sawrahan. In 1044, Anawrahta, son of Kunhsaw Kyaunghpyu, defeated Sokkate, son of Nyaung-u Sawrahan, in single combat and seized the throne.

The chronicles again do not agree with the dates for this period. The dates in later chronicles Yazawin Thit and Hmannan Yazawin now depart from Maha Yazawin dates from 846 CE forward.

Scholarship

A settlement in the Pyu realm

Modern scholarship, however, holds that the Pagan dynasty was founded by the Mranma (Burmans) of the Nanzhao Kingdom in the mid-to-late 9th century CE; that the earlier parts of the chronicle are the histories and legends of the Pyu people, the earliest inhabitants of Burma of whom records are extant; and that Pagan kings had incorporated the Pyu histories and legends as their own.

The earliest human settlement at Pagan is radiocarbon dated to c. 650 CE. But evidence is inconclusive to prove that it was specifically a Burman settlement, not just another Pyu settlement. The 7th century settlement was part of the Pyu realm, which by then had been in existence in the Irrawaddy valley since the 2nd century BCE. (Archaeological evidence shows that as early as the 2nd century BCE, the Pyu had built water-management systems along secondary streams in central and northern parts of the Irrawaddy basin and had founded one of Southeast Asia's earliest urban centres. By the early centuries CE, several walled cities and towns had emerged. The architectural and artistic evidence indicates the Pyu realm's contact with Indian culture by the 4th century CE. The city-states boasted kings and palaces, moats and massive wooden gates, and always 12 gates for each of the signs of the zodiac, one of the many enduring patterns that would continue until the British occupation. Sri Ksetra emerged as the premier Pyu city-state in the 7th century CE. Although the size of the city-states and the scale of political organisation grew during the 7th to early 9th centuries, no sizeable kingdom had yet emerged by the 9th century.)

Arrival of the Mranma
According to G.H. Luce's reconstruction, the millennium-old Pyu realm came crashing down under repeated attacks by the Nanzhao Kingdom of Yunnan between the 750s and 830s CE. Like that of the Pyu, the original home of Burmans prior to Yunnan is believed to be present-day Qinghai and Gansu provinces. After the Nanzhao attacks had greatly weakened the Pyu city-states, large numbers of Burman warriors and their families first entered the Pyu realm in the 830s and 840s and settled at the confluence of the Irrawaddy and Chindwin rivers, perhaps to help Nanzhao pacify the surrounding countryside. Indeed, the naming system of the early Pagan kings—Pyusawhti and his descendants for six generations—was identical to that of the Nanzhao kings where the last name of the father became the first name of the son.

Despite the legendary nature of both pre-Buddhist and Hmannan's Buddhist-inspired stories, a historical Pyusawhti likely existed. Historians conjecture that the historical Pyusawhti was likely a minor chief of the Nanzhao Kingdom, who was in the vanguard of the Nanzhao invasions of the upper Irrawaddy valley that began in 754 (and lasted until the 830s).  Pyusawhti's victory over the Chinese likely refers to the Nanzhao victory over the Chinese in the same era, in which Pyusawhti and his contingents may have participated.

The Pagan "kingdom" Pyusawhti led was likely a small settlement among many other small settlements in the area. (The chronicles count 19 settlements.) In the 8th century, Pagan was not yet a city  or even a city-state, let alone a "kingdom". The city was merely one of several competing city-states until the 10th century. Furthermore, the 38 kings of Pagan Dynasty—from Pyusawhti to Sokkate, prior to the historically verified king Anawrahta—were probably contemporary chiefs of the Pagan area's settlements. According to the British colonial era historian GE Harvey, the Burmese chroniclers likely arranged the lists of rulers of early Burmese polities consecutively, "wishing to portray a continuous lineage stretching back to divine antiquity."

However, some scholars believe that Burmans had arrived in Myanmar much earlier than the mainstream opinion holds. Htin Aung contends that the arrival of Burmans may have been a few centuries earlier, perhaps the early 7th century. Historians Michael Aung-Thwin and Matrii Aung-Thwin write that the 19 villages that first formed the city of Pagan according to the chronicles are "probably" "legendary" but "the origins of the Burmese speakers in Myanmar may well be earlier than, and had nothing to do with, the Nanzhao raid of AD 832".

Thant Myint-U summarises the mainstream opinion that "the Nanzhao Empire had washed up on the banks of the Irrawaddy, and would find a new life, fused with an existing and ancient culture, to produce one of the most impressive little kingdoms of the medieval world. From this fusion would result the Burmese people, and the foundations of modern Burmese culture."

Rise of Pagan

Evidence shows that the actual pace of Burman migration into the Pyu realm was gradual. Indeed, no firm indications have been found at Sri Ksetra or at any other Pyu site to suggest a violent overthrow. Radiocarbon dating shows that human activity existed until c. 870 at Halin, the Pyu city reportedly destroyed by an 832 Nanzhao raid. The region of Pagan received waves of Burman settlements in the mid-to-late 9th century, and perhaps well into the 10th century. By the mid-10th century, Burmans at Pagan had expanded irrigation-based cultivation while borrowing extensively from the Pyus' predominantly Buddhist culture. Pagan's early iconography, architecture and scripts suggest little difference between early Burman and Pyu cultural forms. Moreover, no sharp ethnic distinction between Burmans and linguistically linked Pyus seems to have existed.

Starting in the late 10th century, the principality grew in authority and grandeur. The earliest mention of Pagan in external sources occurs in Song Chinese records, which report that envoys from Pagan visited the Song capital Bianjing in 1004. The city by now was fortified. Radiocarbon dating of Pagan's walls show that Pagan was fortified most probably c. 1020 CE. The Burmese script was already in use by 1035, and perhaps as early as 984 CE. By Anawrahta's accession in 1044, Pagan had grown into a small principality—about 320 km (200 miles) north to south and about 130 km (80 miles) from east to west, comprising roughly the present districts of Mandalay, Meiktila, Myingyan, Kyaukse, Yamethin, Magwe, Sagaing, and the riverine portions of Minbu and Pakkoku. To the north lay the Nanzhao Kingdom, and to the east still largely uninhibited Shan Hills, to the south and the west Pyus, and farther south still, Mons.

See also

 Pagan kings family tree
 Pagan Kingdom
 Pyu city-states
 Sri Ksetra Kingdom
 Tagaung Kingdom

Notes

See also
 Tagaung Kingdom
 Sri Ksetra Kingdom
 Pagan Kingdom

References

Bibliography
 
 
 
 
 
 
 
 
 
 
 
 
 
 

Pagan Kingdom 01
Pagan Kingdom 01
Pagan Kingdom 01
Pagan Kingdom 01
Early
States and territories established in the 650s
States and territories disestablished in the 1040s
650 establishments
1040s disestablishments in Asia